The USC Trojans baseball program is a college baseball team that represents the University of Southern California in the Pac-12 Conference in the National Collegiate Athletic Association. The team has seen 17 individuals hold the head coach position since it started playing organized baseball in the 1889 season.  During some years, the Trojans had two head coaches, and others had non-consecutive tenures. The current coach is Jason Gill, who will lead his first season in 2020.

Having served for 45 years, Rod Dedeaux holds the all-time wins mark at 1,332.

Key

Coaches

Notes

References

Lists of college baseball head coaches in the United States

USC Trojans baseball